Kahit Konting Pagtingin (International title: Just One Glance / ) is a 2013 Philippine drama television series starring Angeline Quinto in her first teleserye, together with Paulo Avelino and Sam Milby. The series premiered on ABS-CBN's Primetime Bida evening block and worldwide on TFC from January 28, 2013, to April 12, 2013, replacing Aryana and was replaced by To the Beautiful You. On March 18, the series demoted to Kapamilya Gold afternoon block to give way for Little Champ.

The series was streaming online on YouTube.

Synopsis

Aurora is a hardworking and simple girl, who strives to make money for her family. While working at a bar one night, she meets Eric Ledesma, who confides in her about his fiancée leaving him heart broken, after calling off their wedding. Although she tries consoling Eric, it leads them to an unfortunate accident where she is forced to lie about being his real fiancée. Through her crazy yet heartwarming journey with the Ledesma family, she also encounters two of Eric's dashing brothers; the serious but sensitive Adam, and the charming and down to earth Lance, who are both more than willing to do anything to win her heart.

Cast and characters

Main cast
 Angeline Quinto as Aurora Cantada-Ledesma
 Sam Milby as Adam Ledesma 
 Paulo Avelino as Lance Ledesma

Supporting cast
 Snooky Serna as Faye Roxas
 Joonee Gamboa as Don Arturo Ledesma
 Mylene Dizon as Narissa Ledesma-Dimagiba
 John Lapus as Milo Santiago
 Tommy Abuel as Valerio "Manong Val" Cantada
 James Blanco as Jacob Dimagiba
 Jordan Herrera as Ivan Sanchez
 Deniesse Joaquin as Jaqueline "Jinky"
 Alexandra Macanan as Giselle L. Crisostomo
 Jon Lucas as Eugene Cantada
 Lance Angelo Lucido as Peter Ledesma

Guest cast
 Ahron Villena as Eric Ledesma
 Bianca Manalo as Mabel Romero
 Lloyd Samartino as Philip Ledesma
 Coco Martin as Bus Passenger
 Precious Lara Quigaman as Olga
 Koreen Medina as Odette

Reception

Soundtrack

See also
List of programs broadcast by ABS-CBN
List of ABS-CBN drama series

References

ABS-CBN drama series
2013 Philippine television series debuts
2013 Philippine television series endings
Philippine romantic comedy television series
Television series by Dreamscape Entertainment Television
Filipino-language television shows
Television shows set in the Philippines